ER1 may refer to:

ER1 (hospital), prototype hospital envisioned for the Washington D.C. area
ER1 electric trainset, manufactured by Rīgas Vagonbūves Rūpnīca from 1957 till 1962
Stadler KISS, electric trainset manufactured from 2008, in Sweden called ER1